Bisaccia is an Italian town and comune, population 4,382, situated in the province of Avellino. It borders the communes of Andretta, Aquilonia, Calitri, Guardia Lombardi, Lacedonia, Scampitella and Vallata.

Bisaccia has its own Bisaccese dialect.

History 
Bisaccia's Castle, made by the Lombards, was repaired by Emperor Frederick II, who went to hunt in the woods near Bisaccia. Famous writers as Torquato Tasso and Francesco de Sanctis visited Bisaccia.

After the 1930 Irpinia earthquake, a new town was built near the historic centre. Like other remote towns, Bisaccia offers houses for 1 euro on the condition that the buyers restore the houses.

Ecclesiastical History 
It was a bishopric from before 1100. In 1540, the Diocese of Bisaccia was suppressed and its territory merged into the Roman Catholic Diocese of Sant’Angelo dei Lombardi–Bisaccia, which became the present Roman Catholic Archdiocese of Sant’Angelo dei Lombardi–Conza–Nusco–Bisaccia.

See also
Polisportiva Bisaccese: a football club based in the town.

Notes

Sources and external links 
 GigaCatholic

Cities and towns in Campania